is a Japanese politician of the Liberal Democratic Party, a member of the House of Representatives in the Diet (national legislature). A native of Saga, Saga and graduate of Keio University, he was elected to the House of Representatives for the first time in 2005 after an unsuccessful run in 2003.

References

External links 
 Official website in Japanese.

Members of the House of Representatives (Japan)
Koizumi Children
Keio University alumni
People from Saga (city)
1973 births
Living people
Liberal Democratic Party (Japan) politicians